Area code 978 was created as a split from area code 508 on September 1, 1997, and covers north central and most of northeastern Massachusetts (LATA code 128). Use of 978 became mandatory on February 1, 1998. Prior to when this area was served by 508 (July 1988), it was served only by the 617 area code, along with the rest of the eastern two-thirds of the state. 351 has been sharing the service area since May 2, 2001. Since then, 10 digit local dialing is mandatory.

Some mobile phone numbers from the 1990s assigned to rate centers in 978 and 351 kept the 508 area code just on those mobile lines after it was split.

Cities/towns 

 Acton
 Ashburnham
 Ashby
 Andover
 Amesbury
 Ayer
 Berlin
 Beverly
 Billerica
 Bolton
 Boxborough
 Burlington
 Carlisle
 Chelmsford
 Clinton
 Concord
 Danvers
 Dracut
 Dunstable
 Fitchburg
 Gardner
 Georgetown
 Gloucester
 Groton
 Groveland
 Harvard
 Haverhill
 Hudson
 Ipswich
 Lancaster
 Lawrence
 Leominster
 Littleton
 Lowell
 Maynard
 Methuen
 Middleton
 Newburyport
 North Reading
 Peabody
 Pepperell
 Princeton
 Rowley
 Salem
 Salisbury
 Shirley
 Sterling
 Stow
 Still River
 Sudbury
 Tewksbury
 Tyngsboro
 Westford
 Westminster
 Wilmington
 Winchendon

Regions
 North Central Massachusetts
 Northeastern Massachusetts

See also
 List of Massachusetts area codes

References

External links

 List of exchanges from Area-Codes.com, 978 Area Code
 List of exchanges from Area-Codes.com, 351 Area Code
 Massachusetts Area Code Map, Mass. Department of Telecommunications and Cable

Telecommunications-related introductions in 1997
Telecommunications-related introductions in 2001
978
978